Mary Cain may refer to:

 Mary Cain (editor) (1904–1984), American newspaper editor and political activist
 Mary Cain (athlete) (born 1996), American middle-distance runner
 Mary Jane Cain (1844–1929), Australian Aboriginal leader

See also 
 Mary Kane, politician
 Lucy Cane, Irish public servant, also known as Mary Cane